Noah Ken Anthony Mascoll-Gomes (born 27 May 1999) is an Antigua and Barbuda competitive swimmer. He competed at the 2016 Summer Olympics in Rio de Janeiro, in the men's 200 metre freestyle. He finished 44th in the heats and did not advance to the semifinals. He was the flag bearer for Antigua and Barbuda in the closing ceremony.

References

1999 births
Living people
Antigua and Barbuda male freestyle swimmers
Olympic swimmers of Antigua and Barbuda
Swimmers at the 2016 Summer Olympics
Swimmers at the 2014 Summer Youth Olympics
Pan American Games competitors for Antigua and Barbuda
Swimmers at the 2015 Pan American Games